The Ministry of Cyber and National Digital Matters was a ministry in the thirty-fifth government of Israel, responsible for the computing and the Governmental Companies Authority. The ministry was founded in 2020 and abolished in the thirty-sixth government of Israel.

History
In April 2019 the CEO of the Ministry of Communications of Israel signed a strategic document, stating that the Ministry of Communications would no longer handle digital matters.

In 2020, after the 2019–20 Israeli political crisis the thirty-fifth government of Israel decided to establish a new ministry. Dudi Amsalem was nominated as a minister.

The Ministry was abolished following the establishment of the Thirty-sixth government of Israel.

Structure
Governmental Computing Authority
Governmental Companies Authority

Ministers

References

External links

Government ministries of Israel
2020 establishments in Israel